Grabica may refer to the following places in Poland:
 Grabica, Łask County, Łódź Voivodeship
 Gmina Grabica, Piotrków County, Łódź Voivodeship
 Grabica, Piotrków County, a village in the gmina